The Treasure of Guarrazar, Guadamur, Province of Toledo, Castile-La Mancha, Spain, is an  archeological find composed of twenty-six votive crowns and gold crosses that had originally been offered to the Roman Catholic Church by the Kings of the Visigoths in the seventh century in Hispania, as a gesture of the orthodoxy of their faith and their submission to the ecclesiastical hierarchy. The most valuable of all is the votive crown of king Recceswinth with its blue sapphires from Sri Lanka and pendilia. Though the treasure is now divided and much has disappeared, it represents the best surviving group of Early Medieval Christian votive offerings.

The treasure, which represents the high point of Visigothic goldsmith's work, was dug between 1858 and 1861 in an orchard called Guarrazar, in Guadamur, very close to Toledo, Spain. The treasure was divided, with some objects going to the Musée de Cluny in Paris and the rest to the armouries of the Palacio Real in Madrid (today in the National Archaeological Museum of Spain). In 1921 and 1936, some items of the Treasure of Guarrazar were stolen and have disappeared.

Some comparable Visigothic filigree gold was found in 1926 at Torredonjimeno in the province of Jaén, consisting of fragments of votive crowns and crosses.

Description 

The jewellery found at Guarrazar is part of a continuous tradition of Iberian metalworking that goes back to prehistoric times. These Visigothic works were influenced by the Byzantines, but the techniques of gem encrustation found at Guarrazar were practised throughout the Germanic world and the style of the lettering was Germanic too. The crowns were never meant to be worn by the kings. They were gifts to the church, to be hung above the altar.

The most valuable remaining pieces of the find are the two royal votive crowns: one of King Recceswinth and one of King Suinthila. Both are made of gold, encrusted with sapphires, pearls, and other precious stones. Suinthila's crown was stolen in 1921 and never recovered. There are several other small crowns and many votive crosses. There were belts in the original find as well, but these have since vanished.

These findings, together with other of some neighbors and with the archaeological excavation of the Ministry of Public Works and the Royal Academy of History (April 1859), formed a group consisting of:

  National Archaeological Museum of Spain: six crowns, five crosses, a pendant and remnants of foil and channels (almost all of gold).
  Royal Palace of Madrid: a crown and a gold cross and a stone engraved with the Annunciation. A crown, and other fragments of a tiller with a crystal ball were stolen from the Royal Palace of Madrid in 1921 and its whereabouts are still unknown.
  National Museum of the Middle Ages, Paris: three crowns, two crosses, links and gold pendants.

There were also many fragments of sculptures and the remains of a building, perhaps a Roman sanctuary or place of purification. After its dedication to Christian worship as a church or oratory, it housed a number of graves. A skeleton lying on a bed of lime and sand was found in the best preserved grave. Its well-preserved stone slate has a Latin inscription that mentions a priest named Crispín, dating from 693 (year of the Sixteenth Council of Toledo). This slate is now in the National Archeological Museum of Spain in Madrid. The inscription on the Sónnica cross, a piece preserved in Paris, gives an indication about the name of this church.

According to some hypothesis, the monastery of Santa Maria de Sorbaces of Guarrazar served as a hideout for the real treasure of the court, Toledo churches and monasteries to prevent their capture by the Islamic conquest of Hispania.

Notes

References 

 
 
 
 
 
 
Perea, Alicia. El tesoro visigodo de Guarrazar (Madrid: Consejo Superior de Investigaciones Científicas),  2001.

External links 
 The Art of medieval Spain, A.D. 500-1200, an exhibition catalog from The Metropolitan Museum of Art Libraries (fully available online as PDF), which contains material on Treasure of Guarrazar (p. 53-59)
  Tesoro de Guarrazar, Municipio de Guadamur - Toledo
 Musée National du Moyen Âge, Hôtel de Cluny: Votive crowns from the Treasure of Guarrazar.

Archaeological sites in Spain
7th century in the Visigothic Kingdom
7th-century works
Treasure troves of Spain
Treasure troves of Medieval Europe
Visigothic art
Germanic archaeological artifacts
Christian art
Medieval art
Votive offering
Gold objects
Individual crowns
Collection of the National Archaeological Museum, Madrid